Frida Svensson (born 18 August 1981 in Falkenberg, Sweden) is a professional sculler. She won a gold medal in the women's single scull at the 2010 World Rowing Championships in Lake Karapiro, the victory was notable for narrowly defeating Ekaterina Karsten who has dominated women's sculling since 1996. She was Swedish Rower of the year in 2006, and won a bronze medal at the women's single scull at the 2006 World Rowing Championships on Dorney Lake Eton.

References

External links

 
 FISA Athlete of the Month April 2008

1981 births
Living people
Swedish female rowers
Olympic rowers of Sweden
Rowers at the 2004 Summer Olympics
Rowers at the 2008 Summer Olympics
Rowers at the 2012 Summer Olympics
World Rowing Championships medalists for Sweden
European Rowing Championships medalists
People from Falkenberg
Sportspeople from Halland County
21st-century Swedish women